Zhou Laiqiang (born 1949) is a retired lieutenant general (zhong jiang) of the People's Liberation Army Air Force (PLAAF) of China. He served as commander of the Shenyang Military Region Air Force and concurrently deputy commander of the Shenyang MR from 2004 to 2012. He was appointed deputy commander of the PLAAF in July 2012, replacing Jing Wenchun who had reached the mandatory retirement age. He is a native of Huai'an, Jiangsu Province.

References 

1949 births
Living people
People's Liberation Army generals from Jiangsu
People's Liberation Army Air Force generals
People from Huai'an